Zsigmondy is a Hungarian surname. Notable people with the surname include:

Adolf Zsigmondy (1816–1880), Hungarian-Austrian dentist
Dénes Zsigmondy (1922–2014), Hungarian violinist
Emil Zsigmondy (1861–1885), Austrian doctor and mountaineer
Karl Zsigmondy (1867–Vienna), Austrian mathematician
Richard Adolf Zsigmondy (1865–1929), Austrian chemist, Nobel prizewinner 1925

See also
Zsigmondy (crater) lunar crater named after Richard Adolf Zsigmondy
Zsigmond

Hungarian-language surnames